Ayoub Abdellaoui (born 16 February 1993) is an Algerian professional footballer who plays for MC Alger and the Algeria national team. He plays as both a central defender and left-back.

Club career
On 3 January 2018, six months before the end of his contract with USM Alger, Abdellaoui signed a three year contract with Swiss club FC Sion, beginning from 1 July 2018.

On 29 August 2021, Abdellaoui joined Saudi Arabian club Al-Ettifaq.
On 12 July 2022, Abdellaoui joined MC Alger.

International career
In 2013, Abdellaoui was part of the Algeria under-20 national team at the 2013 African U-20 Championship. Two years later, he was part of the Algeria under-23 national team at the 2015 U-23 Africa Cup of Nations in Senegal.

Career statistics

Club

Honours
USM Alger
 Algerian Ligue Professionnelle 1: 2015-16
 Algerian Super Cup: 2016

Algeria
FIFA Arab Cup: 2021

References

External links
 
 

1993 births
Living people
People from Réghaïa
Footballers from Algiers
Association football defenders
Algerian footballers
Algeria youth international footballers
Algeria under-23 international footballers
Algeria international footballers
USM Alger players
FC Sion players
Ettifaq FC players
Algerian Ligue Professionnelle 1 players
Swiss Super League players
Saudi Professional League players
Algerian expatriate footballers
Expatriate footballers in Switzerland
Expatriate footballers in Saudi Arabia
Algerian expatriate sportspeople in Switzerland
Algerian expatriate sportspeople in Saudi Arabia
2015 Africa U-23 Cup of Nations players
Footballers at the 2016 Summer Olympics
Olympic footballers of Algeria
21st-century Algerian people
2022 African Nations Championship players
Algeria A' international footballers